BESM (БЭСМ) is the name of a series of Soviet mainframe computers built in 1950–60s. The name is an acronym for "Bolshaya Elektronno-Schetnaya Mashina" ("Большая Электронно-Счётная Машина"), literally "Large Electronic Computing Machine". The series began as a successor to MESM ("Malaya Elektronno-Schetnaya Mashina", "Small Electronic Computing Machine"). MESM was built between 1948 and 1951 and was one of the first electronic computers produced in continental Europe.

Models
The BESM series included six models.

BESM-1
BESM-1, originally referred to as simply the BESM or BESM AN ("BESM Akademii Nauk", BESM of the Academy of Sciences), was completed in 1952. Only one BESM-1 machine was built. The machine used approximately 5,000 vacuum tubes. At the time of completion, it was the fastest computer in Europe. The floating-point numbers were represented as 39-bit words: 32 bits for the mantissa, one bit for sign, and 1 + 5 bits for the exponent. It was capable of representing numbers in the range 10−9 – 1010. BESM-1 had 1024 words of read–write memory using ferrite cores, and 1024 words of read-only memory based on semiconducting diodes. It also had external storage: four magnetic tape units of 30,000 words each, and fast magnetic drum storage with a capacity of 5120 words and an access rate of 800 words/second. The computer was capable of performing 8–10 KFlops. The energy consumption was approximately 30 kW, not accounting for the cooling systems.

BESM-2
BESM-2 also used vacuum tubes.

BESM-3M and BESM-4
BESM-3M and BESM-4 were built using transistors. Their architecture was similar to that of the M-20 and M-220 series. The word size was 45 bits. Thirty BESM-4 machines were built. BESM-4 was used to create the first ever computer animation. The prototypes of both models were made in 1962–63, and the beginning of the series release was in 1964.

EPSILON (a macro language with high level features including strings and lists, developed by Andrey Ershov at Novosibirsk in 1967) was used to implement ALGOL 68 on the M-220.

BESM-6

The BESM-6 was the most well-known and influential model of the series designed at the Institute of Precision Mechanics and Computer Engineering. The design was completed in 1965. Production started in 1968 and continued for the following 19 years.

See also
 Sergei Alekseyevich Lebedev
 Lev Korolyov
 List of Soviet computer systems
 History of computing hardware
 History of computing in the Soviet Union
 List of vacuum tube computers

References

Further reading
 
  A museum curator suggests Russia's BESM supercomputer may have been superior to the USA's supercomputers during the early stages of the Cold War.
 

Mainframe computers
Supercomputers
Vacuum tube computers
Soviet inventions
Transistorized computers
Soviet computer systems